The  Desulfurococcales are an order of the Thermoprotei, part of the kingdom Archaea. The order encompasses a number of genera which are all thermophilic, autotrophs which utilise chemical energy, typically by reducing sulfur compounds using hydrogen.

Phylogeny
The currently accepted taxonomy is based on the List of Prokaryotic names with Standing in Nomenclature (LPSN) and National Center for Biotechnology Information (NCBI).

References

Further reading

Scientific journals

Scientific books

Scientific databases

External links

Archaea taxonomic orders
Thermoproteota